Niel Immelman (born 13 August 1944) is a South African classical pianist resident in the UK.  He grew up in Jacobsdal and later in Bloemfontein.

Immelman first received piano lessons from his mother Nettie Immelman.  He subsequently studied at the Royal College of Music (RCM) with Cyril Smith.  He was also a pupil of Ilona Kabos, Lamar Crowson, and Maria Curcio.  Whilst still a student at the Royal College of Music, Bernard Haitink invited him to perform Rachmaninoff's Rhapsody on a Theme of Paganini with the London Philharmonic Orchestra, as his professional debut.

Immelman has made a speciality of Czech piano music, and has made commercial recordings of the piano works of Josef Suk and of Vítězslav Novak, for the Meridian label.  His four CD recordings of the complete piano works of Suk was the first complete commercial recorded cycle.

Immelman is currently on the piano faculty of the RCM.  He was made a fellow of the RCM in 2000.  He serves regularly as a jury member in various international piano competitions.

References

External links
 Royal College of Music page on Niel Immelman
 Classic SA interview with Niel Immelman, 22 August 2011

South African classical pianists
Alumni of the Royal College of Music
Academics of the Royal College of Music
Living people
Place of birth missing (living people)
1944 births
21st-century classical pianists